Moritz Fürste (born 28 October 1984) is a German field hockey player. He was a member of the Men's National Team that won the gold medal at the 2008 Summer Olympics and 2012 Summer Olympics as well as at the 2006 World Cup. He played at the Uhlenhorster Hockey Club in Hamburg from 1989 till 2012. He was captain of the team. He has guided his team to success in the Euro Hockey League on three occasions, winning the title in 2007–08, 2009–10 and 2011–12. Fürste also helped his team to a second-place finish in the competition in the 2008–09 Season, when they were defeated by HC Bloemendaal of The Netherlands. Since 2012 he is playing at Spanish Club de Campo Villa de Madrid.  After retiring after season 2018-2019 he just signed a new deal with Royal Beerschot THC in Belgium for 1 season.

Moritz Fürste was named as the Euro Hockey League's Most Valuable Player in the 2007–08 and 2009–10 seasons. At the 2011 European Championship, he got the Award as Most Valuable Player of the tournament.

After his nomination in 2010 and 2011 Fürste was named the  IHF World Player of the Year in 2012.

Hockey India League
At the inaugural season of the Hockey India League, Fürste was named one of the six marquee players. At the player's auction, he was bought by Ranchi Rhinos for 75,500, with his base price being 25,000. He captained the team to a first-place finish in the season. In the second season, the Rhinos finished third. Following the franchise's withdrawal from the League, the entire team was drafted under a new franchise and team named Ranchi Rays, for the third season. Fürste, however, pulled out of the tournament to represent his country at the 2015 Indoor World Cup.

At the 2015 players' auctions, he was bought by Kalinga Lancers for 105,000, from a base price of 30,000. His team finished fifth in the round-robin stage and failed to enter the knock-outs. In the 2016 season, he scored the team's lone goal in a 6–1 loss to Punjab Warriors in the final. Reaching the final again in the 2017 season, he scored twice from penalty corner in the final, in the 30th and 59th minutes to beat Dabang Mumbai 4–1. With 12 goals that included 11 penalty corner conversions and one field goal to his name, he emerged as the tournament's top-scorer alongside teammate Glenn Turner.

Hyrox
Fürste co-founded HYROX, a fitness competition format, together with Christian Toetzke in 2017. Every competition starts with a 1 km run, followed by one functional movement, and these two elements are repeated eight times.  Initially started in Germany, the competition has since expanded worldwide. A network of Hyrox-affiliated gyms has also been established.

References

External links
 
 
 
 
 Moritz Fürste at the Deutscher Hockey-Bund 

1984 births
Living people
German male field hockey players
Olympic field hockey players of Germany
Field hockey players at the 2008 Summer Olympics
Olympic gold medalists for Germany
Olympic bronze medalists for Germany
Olympic medalists in field hockey
Field hockey players from Hamburg
Field hockey players at the 2012 Summer Olympics
Field hockey players at the 2016 Summer Olympics
Medalists at the 2008 Summer Olympics
Medalists at the 2012 Summer Olympics
Medalists at the 2016 Summer Olympics
German expatriate sportspeople in India
Uhlenhorster HC players
Hockey India League players
21st-century German people
2006 Men's Hockey World Cup players
2010 Men's Hockey World Cup players